Elizaveta Igorevna Golovanova (born 2 April 1993) is a Russian model and beauty pageant titleholder. She was crowned Miss Russia 2012 and represented her country at Miss World 2012, where she did not place, and Miss Universe 2012, where she finished in the Top 10. She is the first Miss Russia to be born after the Soviet Union collapsed in 1991.

References

External links
 Miss Russia Official Website

1993 births
Living people
Miss Russia winners
Russian female models
Russian beauty pageant winners
Miss World 2012 delegates
Miss Universe 2012 contestants